30350 may refer to:

30350, a ZIP code for Sandy Springs, Georgia, United States
30350, a postal code for Aigremont, Gard, France